18 Shades of Gay is an art installation by Claude Cormier along Sainte-Catherine Street in Montreal's Gay Village, in Quebec, Canada.

The work was initially installed in 2011 and consisted of pink plastic balls. In 2017, the pink balls were replaced with multi-coloured balls. The installation was retired in 2019.

References

External links
 

Centre-Sud
LGBT art in Canada
LGBT culture in Montreal
LGBT monuments and memorials in Canada
Public art in Montreal